{{Speciesbox
| name = Cychrus italicus
|image=Symbola faunae insectorum Helvetiae exhibentia vel species novas vel nondum depictas (9604684667).jpg
|image_caption=Cychrus italicus
| taxon = Cychrus italicus
| authority = Bonelli, 1810
}}Cychrus italicus'' is a species of ground beetle in the subfamily of Carabinae. It was described by Bonelli in 1810.

References

italicus
Beetles described in 1810